Stefan Ristovski (born 12 February 1992) is a Macedonian footballer who plays as a right-back for Dinamo Zagreb and the North Macedonia national team.

Club career 
Born in Skopje, Ristovski began his career at hometown club Vardar before he signed a five-year deal with Italian club Parma in January 2010. He was 17 at the time but the deal could not become official until he turned 18.

Ristovski joined Serie B club Crotone on loan on 6 July 2011. After not receiving much playing time, the loan was cancelled in the January 2012 and he was then loaned to Frosinone for the remainder of the campaign. On 5 July 2012, he was again sent on loan, to Serie B side Bari. He was then loaned out to Latina in the same division for the 2013–14 season, returning to them for a second time in January 2015. Before the bankruptcy of Parma, Ristovski was under contract with Parma until 30 June 2019.

In July 2015, Ristovski moved to Rijeka in Croatia. The transfer was facilitated through Rijeka's Italian partner club, Spezia. In order for Ristovski to remain eligible under Italy's non-EU quota, he was signed by Spezia on a free transfer and then loaned to Rijeka. On 7 August 2017, Ristovski signed with Sporting. On 2 February 2021, he signed for GNK Dinamo Zagreb. He made his debut for Dinamo on 13 February in a derby against Osijek. In his debut, he received two yellow cards and was sent off.

International career 
Ristovski made his debut for Macedonia on 10 August 2011 in an away friendly against Azerbaijan and has, as of April 2020, earned a total of 52 caps, scoring 1 goal.
He represented the nation at UEFA Euro 2020, their first major tournament.

Personal life 
His younger brother Milan is also a professional footballer who plays for the North Macedonia national team.

He also has a Portuguese passport, and his son was born in Portugal.
https://www.slobodenpecat.mk/en/ristovski-protiv-igrachi-kako-fernandesh-i-ronaldo-ne-smeete-da-pravite-greshki/
https://www.uefa.com/european-qualifiers/match/2033895--portugal-vs-north-macedonia/

Career statistics

Club

International 

As of match played 8 September 2020. North Macedonia score listed first, score column indicates score after each Ristovski goal.

Honours

Club 
Rijeka
Prva HNL: 2016–17
Crotian Cup: 2016–17

Sporting CP
 Taça de Portugal: 2018–19
 Taça da Liga: 2017–18, 2018–19

Dinamo Zagreb
Prva HNL: 2020–21
Croatian Cup: 2020–21

Individual 
Croatian First Football League Team of the Year: 2015–16, 2016–17, 2021–22

References

External links 

 Profile at Macedonian Football 

1992 births
Living people
Footballers from Skopje
Association football fullbacks
Association football midfielders
Macedonian footballers
North Macedonia youth international footballers
North Macedonia under-21 international footballers
North Macedonia international footballers
FK Vardar players
Parma Calcio 1913 players
F.C. Crotone players
Frosinone Calcio players
S.S.C. Bari players
Latina Calcio 1932 players
HNK Rijeka players
Sporting CP footballers
GNK Dinamo Zagreb players
Macedonian First Football League players
Serie A players
Serie B players
Serie C players
Croatian Football League players
Primeira Liga players
UEFA Euro 2020 players
Macedonian expatriate footballers
Expatriate footballers in Italy
Macedonian expatriate sportspeople in Italy
Expatriate footballers in Croatia
Macedonian expatriate sportspeople in Croatia
Expatriate footballers in Portugal
Macedonian expatriate sportspeople in Portugal